According to the Primary Chronicle, the first Rus'–Byzantine Treaty was concluded in 907 as a result of Oleg's raid against Constantinople (see Rus'–Byzantine War (907) for details). Scholars generally consider this document as preliminary to the Rus'–Byzantine Treaty of 911.

The text of the treaty, as preserved in the chronicle, opens with a list of signatories on the part of the Rus'. Out of these 15,  there are two who have probably Finnic names, while the rest clearly have Old Norse names (attested Old Norse forms in parentheses): Karly (Karli), Inegeld (Ingjaldr), Farlof (Farulfr), Ver/lemud (Vermu(n)dr), Rulav (Rollabʀ), Stemid/Stemir (Steinviðr), Karn (Karn), Frelav (Friðláfr), Ruar (Hróarr), Truan (Þrándr), Gudy (Góði), Ruald (Hróaldr), and Fost (Fastr).

Most conspicuously, the treaty regulates the status of the colony of Varangian merchants in Constantinople. The text testifies that they settled in the quarter of Saint Mamas. The Varangians were to enter Constantinople through a certain gate, without weapons, accompanied by the imperial guard, not more than fifty people at a time. Upon their arrival, they were enregistered by the imperial authorities in order to be supplied with food and monthly alimentation in the space of half a year.

In the concluding lines of the treaty, the Byzantines kiss the cross, while the Varangians swear by their arms, invoking what the Primary Chronicle calls Perun and Veles.

See also
Trade route from the Varangians to the Greeks

References

 Повесть временных лет, ч. 1—2, М.—Л., 1950. 
 Памятники русского права, в. 1, сост. А. А. Зимин, М., 1952 (библ.). 
 Fyodor Uspensky. The History of the Byzantine Empire, vol. 2. Moscow: Mysl, 1997.

 Jakobsson, Sverrir, The Varangians: In God’s Holy Fire (Palgrave Macmillan, 2020), .
 Alberti, Alberto. 2007. “Ot Boga I Ot Peruna: I Trattati Tra La Rus’ E Bisanzio”. In: Studi Slavistici 4 (1): 7-28. https://doi.org/10.13128/Studi_Slavis-2120.

907
Treaties of the Byzantine Empire
Byzantine Treaty 907
Legal history of Russia
10th-century treaties
Byzantine Treaty 907
900s in the Byzantine Empire
10th century in Kievan Rus'